The premier of Nova Scotia is the first minister to the lieutenant governor of the Canadian province of Nova Scotia and presides over the Executive Council of Nova Scotia. Following the Westminster system, the premier is normally the leader of the political party which has the most seats in the Nova Scotia House of Assembly who is called upon by the lieutenant governor to form a government. As the province's head of government, the premier exercises considerable power.

The current premier of Nova Scotia is Tim Houston, who was sworn in on August 31, 2021. His party, the Progressive Conservative Association of Nova Scotia, was elected in August 2021.

Responsibilities 
The premier serves as president of the Executive Council (Cabinet). They choose the other members of the Cabinet, who are then appointed by the lieutenant governor. As president of the Executive Council, the premier forms the government. They lead the Executive Council’s decision-making process as the Council develops and implements the government's priorities and policies. The premier establishes the Executive Council’s methods of operation and organization and that of its committees.

See also 

 List of premiers of Nova Scotia

References

External links 
 Premier of Nova Scotia Official Site